William Ellis Russell (born October 21, 1948) is a former shortstop, coach and manager in Major League Baseball. Russell played his entire 18-year, 2,181-game career with the Los Angeles Dodgers as the starting shortstop for four National League pennant winners and one World Series championship team.  He also served as the team's manager from 1996 to 1998.

Playing career
During the 1970–71 offseason, Russell was converted to a second baseman, and then – the following year – to shortstop. With Wills out of shape at the start of the 1972 season and mired in a slump, Russell got the start at shortstop on April 29 and held onto the position for the next eleven years. He anchored an infield that included third baseman Ron Cey, second baseman Davey Lopes and first baseman Steve Garvey for eight and one half years. Russell batted .263 over his regular season career, and – coincidentally – posted the same average in 23 World Series games in 1974, 1977, 1978, and 1981. Russell's finest Fall Classic was in 1978, when he garnered 11 hits and batted .423 in a losing effort against the New York Yankees. He also hit .337 over five National League Championship Series. Russell wore number 18.

Russell was hit in the hand with a pitch in September 1980 by Mike LaCoss of the Cincinnati Reds, shattering his right forefinger. He had the finger surgically repaired but was never really the same player afterward and retired in October 1986. Only Zack Wheat played more games as a Dodger and no one in the West Coast portion of Dodgers history has played more games. He played shortstop exclusively from 1974–1983 and alternated playing time at second base, shortstop and the outfield for his final three seasons. Tommy John, who pitched in the major leagues for 26 years, called Russell "the best shortstop that ever played behind me."

Coaching career
Russell became a coach on manager Tommy Lasorda's staff in 1987. In 1992–93, he piloted the Dodgers' Triple-A farm club, the Albuquerque Dukes of the Pacific Coast League, but posted losing records each season. He then rejoined Lasorda and the Los Angeles coaching staff in 1994 and was considered by general manager Fred Claire and team owner Peter O'Malley to be the heir apparent to Lasorda's job. On June 24, the 68-year-old skipper suffered a mild heart attack and Russell became acting manager on June 25. Although Lasorda's health recovered, the Dodger front office decided to make Russell's appointment permanent on July 29 when Lasorda formally announced his retirement, thus making him only the third man to manage the Dodgers in 43 years. Russell finished the 1996 season, compiling a record of 49–37 and bringing the Dodgers home in second place, earning the NL wild card spot in the playoffs before being swept in three games by the Atlanta Braves in the Division Series. The following year, he directed the Dodgers to an 88-74 mark and another runner-up finish in the NL West. However, when the 1998 club stumbled to a 36–38 start – and with the News Corporation poised to buy the team – Russell was fired on June 21 along with Claire in a general housecleaning, ending a 30-year association with the team. His final managing record was 173–149 (.537).

His departure from the Dodgers followed the new ownership's decision to trade Mike Piazza along with third baseman Todd Zeile to the Florida Marlins. Neither Russell nor Claire knew about the trade. Claire, who like Russell had been with the Dodgers in various capacities since 1969, discussed his and Russell's ouster in his book My 30 Years in Dodger Blue.

Russell went on to coach for the Tampa Bay Devil Rays and managed farm teams of both Tampa Bay and the San Francisco Giants, the Dodgers' archrival.  He currently works for Major League Baseball's umpiring division.

Tommy John was good friends with Russell. He described Russell as "a quiet midwesterner...He wasn't a flashy dresser, didn't have a fancy house or car. Those things weren't important to him."

Managerial record

Note: though for only 2.5 years, Russell's 0.537 managerial winning percentage was better than Lasorda's lifetime 0.526.

See also

List of Major League Baseball career stolen bases leaders
List of Major League Baseball players who spent their entire career with one franchise

References

External links

Baseball Gauge
Retrosheet
Venezuelan Professional Baseball League

1948 births
Living people
Arizona Instructional League Dodgers players
Baseball players from Kansas
Bakersfield Dodgers players
Dubuque Packers players
Leones del Caracas players
American expatriate baseball players in Venezuela
Los Angeles Dodgers coaches
Los Angeles Dodgers managers
Los Angeles Dodgers players
National League All-Stars
Pittsburg State University alumni
People from Pittsburg, Kansas
Major League Baseball bench coaches
Major League Baseball shortstops
Minor league baseball managers
Ogden Dodgers players
Spokane Indians players
Tampa Bay Devil Rays coaches